Lacceroic acid (or dotriacontanoic acid) is a saturated fatty acid.

Sources
Lacceroic acid can be derived by saponification of lacceryl lacceroate or by oxidation of 1-Dotriacontanol (lacceryl) and purification of the product. It can also be isolated from stick lac wax, from which the name is derived.

Derivatives
Ethyl lacceroate can be obtained as a crystalline solid (rhombic plates, mp 76 °C) by the action of HCl gas on lacceroic acid in boiling absolute alcohol.

See also
List of saturated fatty acids

References

External links
Lacceroic acid at the Nature Lipidomics Gateway

Fatty acids
Alkanoic acids